The People's Party is an Icelandic political party, which was founded in 2016 by Inga Sæland. The party defines itself as "based on a message of love", its articles of associating stating its goals as [fighting] with thought, word and will for Icelanders who have suffered injustices, differences, lawlessness and poverty."

In the 2021 Icelandic parliamentary election, the party received 8.8% of the votes and got 6 seats in the Althing.

Policies 
The party's electoral priorities in the 2021 election where the following:

 A minimum subsistence level should be ISK 350,000 tax- and deduction-free. A new social security system that ensures a minimum subsistence level and the abolition of deduction of state support because of income. Interactive austerity rules should not lock people in a poverty trap.
 Allow disabled people who can to try their skills in the labor market for two years without deduction in state support and without their disability being reassessed. Encourage disabled individuals to be self-sufficient and never punish them or reduce the state support income of those who want and can help themselves. 
 Ratification of the United Nations Convention on the Rights of Persons with Disabilities.
 Increase the free income limit for old-age pensions of state´s pension income from ISK 25,000 up to ISK 100,000. Abolish deduction to state´s old-age pensions due to employment income.  
 Fully secure the funding of the Icelandic health care system.
 A fishery policy based on that the fishing grounds around Iceland are a common property of the nation, not private property. The state should get a full price for access to the marine resources and for the fishing quotas. Ensure that inhabitants of coastal villages enjoy an increased right to utilize the marine resource. Boost coastal fishing by make handline fishing free.
 In housing, abolish inflation indexation of mortgages. Abolish the sky-high prepayment fees on loan agreements. Fight against housing shortages by creating incentives for increased construction of new housing.

Icelandic parliamentary elections
 The party ran in the 2016 Icelandic parliamentary election. It received 3.5% of the votes, and thus failed to pass the 5% threshold required to enter the legislature.
 In the 2017 Icelandic parliamentary election, the party received 6.88% of the votes, and gained four seats in the Althing.
 In the 2021 Icelandic parliamentary election, the party received 8.8% of the votes, and got six seats in the Althing out of sixty-three seats.

Electoral priorities in the 2021 parliamentary elections
In the 2021 parliamentary election, the party´s electoral priorities were:

Welfare and the fight against poverty
 The minimum subsistence level will be ISK 350,000, tax- and deduction-free!
 Introduce a new social security system that ensures a minimum subsistence level and the abolition of deduction of state support because of income. Let not interactive austerity rules lock people in a poverty trap.

The disabled
 Allow all disabled people who can to try their skills in the labor market for two years without any deduction in state support and without their disability being reassessed.
 Encourage the individual to be self-sufficient and never punish them or reduce the income of those who want and can save themselves in some way.
 All aids equipment should be exempt from VAT.
 Ratification of the United Nations Convention on the Rights of Persons with Disabilities.

Senior citizens
 Increase the free income limit for old-age pensions of state´s pension income from ISK 25,000 up to ISK 100,000. 
 Abolish deduction to state´s old-age pensions due to employment income.
 Ensure the safety of the elderly in residential and nursing accommodation.

Pension funds
 Ensure increased democracy and transparency in pension funds.
 Ensure that pension rights are inherited upon death.

Health Care
 Fully secure the funding of the health care system.
 Eliminate waiting lists for necessary health care.
 Ensure that people born with blemishes receive reimbursement for medical procedures from the Icelandic Health Insurance.
 Never accept that children have to wait for urgent medical attention.

Housing market
 Abolish inflation indexation of mortgages.
 Able people to refinance inflation indexed loans with non-indexed loans without being subject to a credit rating and payment assessment.
 Abolish the sky-high prepayment fees on loan agreements that the Housing Financing Fund made at the time.
 Fight against housing shortages by creating incentives for increased construction of new housing.

Fisheries
 Full price for access to the marine resource and the fishing quota.
 A new fishery policy based on that the fishing grounds around Iceland are a common property of the nation and not private property.
 Ensure that the inhabitants of coastal villages enjoy an increased right to utilize the marine resource with a positive effect on the fishing grounds across the country.
 Boost coastal fishing by make handline fishing free.
 The nation should receive full price for access to its resources.
 Enactment of a provision on national ownership of natural resources in the constitution.

Students’ loans
 Give students freedom to earn extra income - without cuts in students loans.

The Environment and Climate Change 
 The People's Party views man-made climate change as a grave global environmental problem. Pollution respects no borders.
 Iceland should to take an active part in the fight against climate change in international co-operation. 
 Wetland restoration, the electrification of the car fleet, environmentally friendly energy for ships, the production of renewable energy and increased forestry are the countermeasures Iceland should emphasize on.
 Iceland should take responsibility in the fight against climate change without environmental protection measures affecting the public who have little financial means.
 Against green taxes that increase inequality and poverty. They should pay the most who pollute the most.
 Iceland´s clean energy sources should be wisely used to reduce pollution, while at the same time consider nature conservation.

The Highlands
 We do not support restrictions on the public freedom of movement within the country to enjoy their own nature. The Highlands cannot be institutionalized in the form of a national park with associated ministerial powers at the expense of public access. We trust the locals in the surrounding municipalities to take care of the Highlands.
 It is extremely important that the public has easy access to the refreshing paradise of the Icelandic Highlands free of charge. Not everyone can afford to travel abroad. Icelanders have enjoyed it for a long time, for example within the framework of outdoor clubs, and have generally been successful. We trust these people to enjoy the highlands, and to respect and protect them at the same time.

Funding of the campaign promises
 Abolish the pension fund exemption to withhold taxes upon deposit to the pension funds. Thus, the cash payment will be taken immediately upon deposit, but not when the funds are paid out as currently. To give the Treasury "tens of billions of dollars annually" in increased revenues without compromising the people's pension rights.
 Transfer the personal tax credit from the rich to the poorer.
 Full price will be charged for access to the marine resource. 
 Implementation of the bank tax again, as there is no real competition as the banks’ profits prove.
 Clean up the system and reduce any unnecessary government spending.

Controversies and expulsions
At the end of November 2018, the party expelled two of its parliamentarians, Karl Gauti Hjaltason and Ólafur Ísleifsson, after a meeting of these with members of the Centre Party where Karl Gauti and Ólafur did not object to derogatory remarks of Centre Party members against the People's Party's leader, Inga Sæland.

Electoral results

Parliament

References

External links 
People's Party

Political parties established in 2016
2016 establishments in Iceland
Eurosceptic parties in Iceland
Populist parties